Dariush (also spelled Darioush, Daryoush or Daryoosh) is a common Persian male given name in Iran. Dariush is composed of dāraya- [hold] + vash- [good], meaning "holding firm the good".

It was the throne name of Darius the Great and two other kings of the Achaemenid dynasty, which thus enjoyed considerable popularity among noblemen in later periods. Historically it has translated into English and Latin as "Darius".

Etymology
, (Greek , Aramaic , Elamite , Akkadian ). The longer Old Persian  is composed of  [hold] +  [good], meaning "holding firm the good".

People

Beneil Dariush (born May 6, 1989), Assyrian-American professional mixed martial artist
Dariush Arjmand, Iranian actor
Dariush Ashoori, Iranian intellectual 
Dariush (singer) Dariush Eghbali (AKA Dariush), Iranian pop singer
Dariush Forouhar, leader of the nationalist Mellat Iran party
Dariush Homayoon, Iranian politician
Dariush Mehrjui, Iranian film director
Daryush Shokof, Iranian artist, filmmaker, philosopher
Dariush Safvat, Persian ethnomusicologist
Dariush Shayegan, Iranian academic
 Roosh V (AKA Daryush "Roosh V" Valizadeh), controversial American pickup artist

See also
Darius, an English transliteration/spelling
Daris, a transliteration/spelling in Germanic and Slavic languages

References

Persian masculine given names